B. N. Deshmukh (19 January 1935 ― 28 May 2020) was an Indian Judge and former acting Chief Justice of the Bombay High Court.

Career
B. N. Deshmukh was born as Balbhimarao Narsingrao Deshmukh in 1935. He studied International Law in England and started practice in the Bombay High Court in 1963. He was a Member as well as Chairman of the Maharashtra State Bar Council. Deshmukh was also a member of the upper house of the Maharashtra Legislative Council during 1972–1976 on behalf of Peasants and Workers Party of India. He was appointed Additional Judge of the Aurangabad bench of Bombay High Court on 21 November 1986. He became a permanent Judge of the High Court in 1987. Deshmukh worked as acting Chief Justice of the said High Court in different times. He was popularly known for giving judgement on the common man's interests.

References

1935 births
2020 deaths
Indian judges
Judges of the Bombay High Court
Chief Justices of the Bombay High Court
20th-century Indian judges
21st-century Indian judges
Members of the Maharashtra Legislative Assembly
Peasants and Workers Party of India politicians